Owings Mills is an unincorporated community and census-designated place in Baltimore County, Maryland, United States. It is a suburb of Baltimore. Per the 2020 census, the population was 35,674. Owings Mills is home to the northern terminus of the Baltimore Metro Subway, and housed the Owings Mills Mall until its closure in 2015. It is also home to the Baltimore Ravens' headquarters facility, and the studios for Maryland Public Television. In 2008, CNNMoney.com named Owings Mills number 49 of the "100 Best Places to Live and Launch".

Geography
Owings Mills is located at  (39.412282, −76.793065).

Geology
The Soldiers Delight Natural Environment Area is in the Owings Mills area. It is a serpentinite barren fostering a unique ecosystem as a result of the dissolution of the rock into an easily eroded thin soil. This site and the Bare Hills District have historically been sources of chromium ore, and during the 19th century they were the largest producers of chrome in the world.

Demographics

2020 census

Note: the US Census treats Hispanic/Latino as an ethnic category. This table excludes Latinos from the racial categories and assigns them to a separate category. Hispanics/Latinos can be of any race.

2010 Census
As of the census of 2010, there were 30,622 people and 12,525 households in the CDP. The racial makeup of the CDP was 34.3% White, 51.0% African American, 0.3% Native American, 7.8% Asian, 0.1% Native Hawaiian or other Pacific Islander, 3.3% some other race, and 3.3% from two or more races. Hispanic or Latino of any race were 7.0% of the population.

There were 12,525 households, out of which 29.0% had children under the age of 18 living with them, 37.5% were headed by married couples living together, 16.1% had a female householder with no husband present, and 42.1% were non-families. Of all households 33.2% were made up of individuals, and 7.1% were someone living alone who was 65 years of age or older. The average household size was 2.34, and the average family size was 3.01.

In the CDP, the population was spread out, with 21.9% under the age of 18, 12.5% from 18 to 24, 35.7% from 25 to 44, 22.0% from 45 to 64, and 8.0% who were 65 years of age or older. The median age was 32.6 years. For every 100 females, there were 81.6 males. For every 100 females age 18 and over, there were 77.2 males.

At the 2000 census, the median income for a household in the CDP was $53,424, and the median income for a family was $61,079. Males had a median income of $41,135 versus $33,359 for females. The per capita income for the CDP was $27,107. About 4.6% of families and 5.9% of the population were below the poverty line, including 6.8% of those under age 18 and 9.2% of those age 65 or over.

Education
Owings Mills is served by the Baltimore County Public Schools system. Schools include New Town Elementary, Owings Mills Elementary, Lyons Mill Elementary, Timber Grove Elementary in adjacent Reisterstown, Glyndon Elementary, Deer Park Middle Magnet, Owings Mills High, and New Town High. There are also several private schools in the area, including McDonogh School, a Pre-K–12 school and Garrison Forest School, also a Pre-K–12 school.  McDonogh School is co-ed while Garrison Forest is all girls.

Owings Mills is home to a satellite branch of the three campuses of the Community College of Baltimore County system (CCBC) (Dundalk, Essex and Catonsville) and a branch of the ITT Technical Institute. Stevenson University (formerly Villa Julie College), opened its Owings Mills campus in 2004, an addition to its original Stevenson campus nearby to the east.

Transportation

Roads
Some of the major roads in the Owings Mills area are:

Bonita Avenue
Caves Road
Dolfield Road
Garrison Forest Road (MD-129 on most northern block)
Greenspring Avenue (formerly MD-519)
Gwynnbrook Avenue
Greenspring Valley Road (MD-130)
Lakeside Boulevard
Lyons Mill Road
Marriottsville Road
McDonogh Road
Northwest Expressway (I-795)
Owings Mills Boulevard (MD-940 near I-795 interchange)
Reisterstown Road (MD-140)
Painters Mill Road
Park Heights Avenue (MD-129)
Red Run Boulevard
Rosewood Lane

Public transportation
Owings Mills station, the northwestern terminus of the Baltimore Metro Subway, is on Painters Mills Road, very close to the mall. There is also public bus service available on Maryland Transit Administration bus route nos. 87 and 89. Both routes operate on Painters Mill Road, to the mall and the Metro, and on different portions of Reisterstown Road.

Attractions and facilities
Owings Mills is home to approximately a dozen major shopping centers and numerous office buildings. In the center of Owings Mills was Owings Mills Mall, an enclosed shopping mall. The mall, which opened in 1986, once featured more than 150 stores. The mall closed in 2015, and was completely demolished in March 2017. The former mall has since been redeveloped into Mill Station, which is a 620,000 sq ft retail devolpment. The first retailer to open its doors in the new Mill Station was Costco, who hosted their ribbon cutting ceremony in October 2018. As of February 2021, Mill Station is home to Costco, Lowe's Giant, HomeSense, AMC, and more. It is also within walking distance to the Metro Centre, which holds the northern most stop on the Baltimore Metro, along with restaurants and shopping. 

Many nationally known organizations and businesses call Owings Mills home, including CareFirst, T. Rowe Price, Lion Brothers, The Baltimore Life Companies, Talbot Settlement & Escrow, Black & Decker, the Baltimore Ravens headquarters facility, and Maryland Public Television studios (formerly the Maryland Center for Public Broadcasting). A large manufacturing complex dates to 1926 as the site of Maryland Baking Company, and then starting in 1957 housed Maryland Cup (see Sweetheart Cup Company), the Fort Howard Paper Corporation (see Georgia-Pacific), and finally the Solo Cup Company, which closed the plant in 2011. In 2015, the property started redevelopment into a shopping complex, Foundry Row. The first store to open in Foundry Row was Wegmans, which launched in September 2016.

The Irvine Nature Center moved to a property here, in the Caves Valley Historic District, in 2008.

The abandoned Rosewood Center, a former asylum for people with mental disabilities, is in Owings Mills. It was shut down in 2010 due to numerous issues, including lead and asbestos contamination, and lack of equipment inventory. It was used as a training location for the Maryland state police until 2013, when a police officer in training was shot and killed on the location during training.   Stevenson University acquired Rosewood in 2017 and finalized an agreement with the State of Maryland in September 2020 for the redevelopment of the site for their addition to the campus, to be known as Owings Mills East. The development is expected to take 18 months, and as of December 2020 has been continuing as scheduled despite the COVID-19 pandemic.

In media and popular culture
 The TV program Wall $treet Week with Louis Rukeyser was produced by Maryland Public Television at its studios in Owings Mills during its original run from 1972 to 2005; many viewers became familiar with the town as the program's mailing address. Others became familiar with it as the mailing address of the still-running weekly automotive series MotorWeek since 1981. Local roads can often be seen on the program.
 Rosewood Center is the location for the film The Institute.

See also
 On Nature's Trail

References

External links

 University Project: Visions for a sustainable city: Owings Mills (mainly pictures)
 Owings Mills Volunteer Fire Department, incorporated 1921
 Quick Facts Gov Census
 History of Owings Mills

 
Census-designated places in Baltimore County, Maryland
Census-designated places in Maryland